Gwaai Edenshaw is a Haida artist and filmmaker from Canada. Along with Helen Haig-Brown, he co-directed Edge of the Knife, the first Haida language feature film.

Background 
The son of noted Haida artist Guujaaw (Gary Edenshaw), he was raised on Haida Gwaii. At age 16, he went to Vancouver to apprentice as an artist with Bill Reid. He received a diploma in jewellery design from Vancouver Community College. As of 2018, he lived in Sechelt, BC with his partner, musician Kinnie Starr.

Career
As an artist, Edenshaw has worked primarily in woodcarving and jewellery, as well as some work in sketch and painting. His work has been exhibited in a number of galleries in both Canada and the United States, and he curated a show on indigenous erotica in 2013.

He created Haidawood, an animated web series which premiered in 2007, and cowrote the theatrical play Sounding Gambling Sticks with his brother Jaalen Edenshaw in 2008. He wrote some Haida-inspired music for Bruce Ruddell's 2010 rock opera Beyond Eden. He is a founding member of Q’altsi’da Kaa, a group which promotes traditional Haida storytelling.

In 2017 Edenshaw and Haig-Brown began production on Edge of the Knife. Based on the traditional Haida story of  the "wild man", who loses his grip on reality in the forest before being returned to his community in a healing ceremony, the film had its theatrical premiere at the 2018 Toronto International Film Festival.

The film won the awards for Best Canadian Film and Best British Columbia Film at the 2018 Vancouver International Film Festival, and the Sun Jury Award at the imagineNATIVE Film + Media Arts Festival. It won several year-end awards from the Vancouver Film Critics Circle, for Best Canadian Film and Best British Columbia Film, Best Director and Best Actor (Tyler York). It was named to TIFF's annual year-end Canada's Top Ten list for 2018.

References

External links 
 

1977 births
Living people
21st-century Canadian artists
21st-century Canadian dramatists and playwrights
21st-century Canadian screenwriters
21st-century First Nations writers
Canadian jewellers
Canadian male dramatists and playwrights
Canadian male screenwriters
Film directors from British Columbia
First Nations dramatists and playwrights
First Nations filmmakers
First Nations screenwriters
First Nations sculptors
Haida woodcarvers
Writers from British Columbia